Morkovkin (from morkov meaning carrot) is a Russian masculine surname, its feminine counterpart is Morkovkina. It may refer to
Anastassia Morkovkina (born 1981), Estonian football striker
Valentin Morkovkin (1933–1999), Russian rower

Russian-language surnames